is a railway station located in the city of Hashima, Gifu Prefecture,  Japan, operated by the private railway operator Meitetsu.

Lines

Station layout
Fuwa Ishiki Station has one ground-level side platform serving a single bi-directional track. The station is unattended.

Adjacent stations

History
Fuwa Ishiki Station opened on June 25, 1921.

Surrounding area
Masaki Elementary School

See also
 List of Railway Stations in Japan

External links

  

Railway stations in Japan opened in 1921
Stations of Nagoya Railroad
Railway stations in Gifu Prefecture
Hashima, Gifu